Lister Hundred, or Listers härad, was a hundred of Blekinge in Sweden.

Parishes
Parishes ordered by municipality:

Karlshamn Municipality
Elleholm Parish
Mörrum Parish
Olofström Municipality
Jämshög Parish
Kyrkhult Parish
Sölvesborg Municipality
Mjällby Parish
Ysane Parish
Gammalstorp Parish

Subdivisions of Sweden